Patience Halsey Sherman (born September 20, 1946) is an American former competition swimmer.

Sherman was born in Montclair, New Jersey.  She trained with the New Jersey Swim Association.

Sherman represented the United States at the 1964 Summer Olympics in Tokyo.  She swam for the gold medal-winning U.S. team in the preliminary heats of the women's 4×100-meter freestyle relay.  Under the 1964 international swimming rules, she did not receive a medal because she did not compete in the event final.

References

External links
  Patience Sherman – Olympic athlete profile at Sports-Reference.com

1946 births
Living people
American female freestyle swimmers
Olympic swimmers of the United States
People from Montclair, New Jersey
Swimmers at the 1964 Summer Olympics
21st-century American women